This is a list of Surrey Twenty20 cricket records; that is, record team and individual performances in Twenty20 cricket for Surrey. Surrey have played nearly 100 Twenty20 matches since first doing so in 2003. Records for Surrey in first-class cricket, the longest form of the game, are found at List of Surrey first-class cricket records. Those for List A cricket are found at List of Surrey List A cricket records.

All statistics are up-to-date as of 8 August 2011.

Listing notation 
Team notation
 (300–3) indicates that a team scored 300 runs for three wickets and the innings was closed, either due to a successful run chase or if no playing time remained.
 (300–3 d) indicates that a team scored 300 runs for three wickets, and declared its innings closed.
 (300) indicates that a team scored 300 runs and was all out.

Batting notation
 (100) indicates that a batsman scored 100 runs and was out.
 (100*) indicates that a batsman scored 100 runs and was not out.

Bowling notation
 (5–100) indicates that a bowler has captured 5 wickets while conceding 100 runs.

Currently playing
 Record holders who are currently playing for the county (i.e. their record details listed could change) are shown in bold.

Team records

Results by opponent

Margins of victory

Scores

Individual records

Appearances

Batting

Career

Season

Innings

Bowling

Career

Season

Innings

Fielding

Career

Season

Innings

Wicket-keeping

Career

Season

Innings

Partnership records

References

External links 
 Surrey Twenty20 records on CricketArchive

Surrey
Surrey County Cricket Club records
Cricket
Surrey